Sabrina Beneett is a Malaysian Indian pageant titleholder, who was seated unplaced Miss Universe Malaysia 2014 at the Miss Universe Malaysia 2014 held at Setia City Convention Centre in Setia Alam. She represent Malaysia at the Miss Universe 2014 in Florida and ended up did not make it to the semifinalists round, this is the 44th consecutive year Malaysia did not placed in Miss Universe pageant.

Early life
Sabrina Beneett is a freelance model who hails from the state of Perak. She is a Malaysian Indian. She is a modern-day farm girl and holds a double BSc in Psychology and Communication.

Personal life
She wishes to kick start her own non-profit organization and use her psychology background to help provide support for rape victims to cope with life after rape. She is also very passionate about eradicating whats remaining of the poverty trap by certain communities in her country by helping them adopt necessary skills for survival. Most of her charitable work revolves around issues concerning underprivileged women and the poor.

Pageantry

Miss Universe Malaysia 2014
Sabrina started off as a runway model in her teenage years and received her first award as Miss Selangor in 2011. From then on she was crowned the 2nd runner up for Miss India Malaysia 2013 and secured 3 other special accolades. Her most recent victory has been her crowning as Miss Universe Malaysia 2014 after which she represented her country Malaysia in Doral, Florida on Jan 25th, 2015. During the coronation night, both Sabrina and pageant runner up Lalitha Monisha become huge favorites to win the crown. Luck however belonged to Sabrina when she won the title, which in turn gave her the right to represent her country.

Miss Universe 2014
Sabrina represented Malaysia at Miss Universe 2014 where she remained unplaced. Although considered a "Black Horse" contestant by expert pageant website Missosology, she failed to place in the top 15 semifinalists.

Miss Covid 2021 & 2022
Sabrina represented Malaysia at Miss Covid 2021 and Miss Covid 2022 winning best "bust" title

See also
Miss Universe 2014

References

Malaysian beauty pageant winners
Malaysian people of Indian descent
Living people
1990 births
Malaysian Christians
Miss Universe 2014 contestants